Abramelin oil, also called Oil of Abramelin, is a ceremonial magic oil blended from aromatic plant materials. Its name came about due to its having been described in a medieval grimoire called The Book of Abramelin written by Abraham the Jew (presumed to have lived from c. 1362 – c. 1458). The recipe is adapted from the Jewish Holy anointing oil of the Tanakh, which is described in the Book of Exodus (30:22-25) attributed to Moses.

Abramelin oil became popular in the Western esoteric tradition in the 20th century after the publication of the S. L. MacGregor Mathers English translation of The Book of the Sacred Magic of Abramelin the Mage (1897), and especially via Aleister Crowley, who used a similar version of the oil in his system of Magick. There are multiple recipes in use today and the oil continues to be used in several modern occult traditions, particularly Thelema (created in 1904 by Crowley) and the Ecclesia Gnostica Catholica.

Ingredients and methods of preparation

There are, especially among English-speaking occultists, numerous variant forms of Abramelin Oil.

Abramelin oil 
The oil is described in The Book of Abramelin by Abraham of Worms, a Jew from Worms, Germany, presumed to have lived from c.1362–c.1458.  In the English translation The Book of Abramelin: A New Translation (2006) by Steven Guth of Georg Dehn, which was compiled from all the known German manuscript sources, the formula reads as follows:

Guth's translation of the recipe may be incorrect. The German sources clearly list "Calmus" or "Kalmus".  But, instead of calamus, Guth has translated these as "galanga root" (galangal). Taking this into account, the five ingredients listed by Abraham of Worms in The Book of Abramelin are identical to those listed in the Bible. Only the proportions are slightly different (one-half versus one part of calamus).

In the first printed edition, Peter Hammer, 1725, the recipe reads:

Note that the proportions in this edition conform with the recipe for Holy anointing oil from the Bible (Exodus 30:22-25):

Samuel Mathers' Abramelin oil 

According to the S. L. MacGregor Mathers English translation from 1897, which derives from an incomplete French manuscript copy of The Book of Abramelin, the recipe is:

The four ingredients listed by Mathers in his translation of The Book of the Sacred Magic of Abramelin the Mage (1897) are Myrrh, Cinnamon, Galangal, and Olive oil. The word that he translated from the French as "Galangal" is actually the word "Calamus." The other extant manuscripts also list "Calamus" as the ingredient. It is unknown if Mathers' use of Galangal instead of Calamus was intentional or a mistranslation, but it was to result in several notable changes, including symbolism and use.

Since Cinnamon and Cassia are two species of the same Cinnamomum genus, their doubling up into one name by the translator of the French manuscript is not unexpected. His reasons for doing so may have been prompted by a pious decision to avoid duplicating true Holy Oil, or by a tacit admission that in medieval Europe, it was difficult to obtain Cinnamon and Cassia as separate products.

Abramelin oil made with essential oils

A recipe for Abramelin oil using essential oils is as follows:

 half part cinnamon essential oil 
 1 part myrrh essential oil 
 1 part calamus essential oil
 1 part cassia essential oil
 one-quarter of the foregoing total weight olive oil

Since ancient perfumers and apothecaries never compounded their fragrances by mixing essential oils in such large ratio with respect to carrier oils—because the original formula was to be distilled after maceration, not before—it is possible to restore the proportions to something like what they might have been if maceration and distillation had occurred "according to the art of the apothecary":

 half part cinnamon essential oil 
 1 parts myrrh essential oil 
 1 part calamus essential oil
 1 part cassia essential oil
 7 parts olive oil

This is a highly fragranced oil that may be applied to the skin in more liberal amounts; it is a close, modern approximation of the oil described by Abramelin to Abraham of Worms.

Essential oil variation of the Biblical recipe:

 1 part myrrh oil
 1 part cassia oil
 1/2 part cinnamon leaf oil
 1/2 part "keneh bosem" oil, which is sometimes spelled "kaneh bosem" (see article Holy anointing oil section "Identification of kaneh bosem")
 7 parts olive oil.

The Biblical holy anointing oil described in Exodus  was created from:

 Pure myrrh (מר דרור ) 500 shekels (about 6 kg/13 lbs)
 Sweet cinnamon (קינמון בשם ) 250 shekels (about 3 kg/6 lbs)
 Kaneh bosem (קְנֵה-בֹשֶׂם ) 250 shekels (about 3 kg/6 lbs)
 Cassia (קדה ) 500 shekels (about 6 kg/13 lbs)
 Olive oil (שמן זית ) one hin (about 5 quarts according to Adam Clarke; about 4 litres according to Shiurei Torah, 7 litres according to the Chazon Ish)

Macerated Abramelin oil

A recipe for Abramelin oil based upon the French manuscript:

 4 parts cinnamon bark quills, reduced to powder
 2 parts myrrh resin, finely ground 
 1 part calamus chopped root, reduced to powder
 half of the foregoing total weight olive oil

The mixture is macerated for one month, then decanted and bottled for use, producing a fragranced oil suitable for anointing any portion of the body, and will not burn the skin. It may be applied liberally, after the manner of traditional Jewish Holy Oils, such as the one which was poured on Aaron's head until it ran down his beard. It is not, however, made "according unto the art of the apothecary", since it is not distilled after the maceration but decanted into bottles.

Mathers' Macerated Abramelin oil

Making Abramelin oil according to S. L. MacGregor Mathers' 1897 translation of the French manuscript requires compounding the oil from raw ingredients. The ratio given in the book is as follows:

 4 parts cinnamon bark quills, reduced to powder
 2 parts myrrh resin tears, finely ground 
 1 part galangal sliced root, reduced to powder
 half of the foregoing total weight olive oil

This mixture is macerated for one month, and then using an apothecary's perfume press the oil would then be separated and bottled for use. The result is a fragranced oil suitable for anointing any portion of the body, and it will not burn the skin.

As essential oils are approximately 2% of raw ingredients on average, it is possible to make the oil this way using essential oils, by multiplying the total weight by 25 [50 for total weight, divided by 2] for the olive oil quantity or enough olive oil to ensure that the essential oils are completely dissolved. This will have the same effect of the oil no longer burning the skin. Once dissolved the olive oil will change from green to silver in colour.

Crowley's Abramelin oil made with essential oils

Early in the 20th century, the British occultist Aleister Crowley created his own version of Abramelin Oil, which he called "Oil of Abramelin," and sometimes referred to as the "Holy Oil of Aspiration." It was based on S. L. MacGregor Mathers' substitution of Galangal for Calamus. Crowley also abandoned the book's method of preparation—which specifies blending Myrrh "tears" (resin) and "fine" (finely ground) Cinnamon—instead opting for pouring together distilled essential oils with a small amount of olive oil. His recipe (from his Commentary to Liber AL vel Legis) reads as follows:

 8 parts cinnamon essential oil 
 4 parts myrrh essential oil 
 2 parts galangal essential oil
 7 parts olive oil

Crowley weighed out his proportions of essential oils according to the recipe specified by Mathers' translation for weighing out raw materials. The result is to give the Cinnamon a strong presence, so that when it is placed upon the skin "it should burn and thrill through the body with an intensity as of fire". This formula is unlike the grimoire recipe and it cannot be used for practices that require the oil to be poured over the head. Rather, Crowley intended it to be applied in small amounts, usually to the top of the head or the forehead, and to be used for anointment of magical equipment as an act of consecration.

Doubly consecrated Crowley oil of Abramelin recipe

It is possible to add 1 part of a previously consecrated batch of the Crowley version of Abramelin oil to each new batch. This can be done for magical reasons and does not change the proportions of the ingredients.

Symbolism of the ingredients

Many traditions of magic work with plant materials, and most also assign some symbolic meanings or ascriptions to these ingredients.

In the Jewish tradition, from whence came the original Biblical recipe upon which Abramelin Oil is based, the Olive is a symbol of domestic felicity and stability, Myrrh is believed to be sacred to the Lord, Calamus is known for its sweetness and phalliform fruiting body and stands for fertility and for love, while Cinnamon is favoured for its warming ability.

In hoodoo folk magic, these symbolisms are somewhat changed:  Myrrh and Olive remain the same, but Cinnamon is for money and luck, and Calamus is used to sweetly control others. (The Matherian alternative, Galangal, is employed in protective work, especially that involving court cases.)

Crowley also had a symbolic view of the ingredients that he found in the Mathers translation:

This oil is compounded of four substances. The basis of all is the oil of the olive. The olive is, traditionally, the gift of Minerva, the Wisdom of God, the Logos. In this are dissolved three other oils; oil of myrrh, oil of cinnamon, oil of galangal. The Myrrh is attributed to Binah, the Great Mother, who is both the understanding of the Magician and that sorrow and compassion which results from the contemplation of the Universe. The Cinnamon represents Tiphereth, the Sun -- the Son, in whom Glory and Suffering are identical. The Galangal represents both Kether and Malkuth, the First and the Last, the One and the Many, since in this Oil they are One. [...] These oils taken together represent therefore the whole Tree of Life. The ten Sephiroth are blended into the perfect gold.

Abramelin oil in occult tradition

The original popularity of Abramelin Oil rested on the importance magicians place upon Jewish traditions of Holy Oils and, more recently, upon S. L. MacGregor Mathers' translation of The Book of the Sacred Magic of Abramelin the Mage (1897) and the resurgence of 20th century occultism, such as found in the works of the Hermetic Order of the Golden Dawn and Aleister Crowley, and has since spread into other modern occult traditions.

Because it derives from the formula for Jewish Holy Oil, Abramelin Oil also finds use among Jewish and Christian Kabbalists who are not specifically performing the works described by Abraham of Worms. However, the oil can be used in the course of ritual activities outlined in the book by Abramelin the Mage in order to obtain the outcomes he promised those who successfully applied his system of  "Divine Science" and "True Magic", namely, the gifts of flight, treasure-finding, and invisibility, as well as the power to cast effective love spells.

Oil of Abramelin and Thelema

Oil of Abramelin was seen as highly important by Aleister Crowley, the founder of Thelema, and he used his version of it throughout his life. In Crowley's mystical system, the oil came to symbolize the aspiration to what he called the Great Work—"The oil consecrates everything that is touched with it; it is his aspiration; all acts performed in accordance with that are holy". 

Crowley went on to say:

This oil is currently used in several ceremonies of the Thelemic church, Ecclesia Gnostica Catholica, including the rites of Confirmation and Ordination. It is also commonly used to consecrate magical implements and temple furniture. The eucharistic host of the Gnostic Mass—called the Cake of Light—includes this oil as an important ingredient.

Effects of Mathers' recipe and Crowley's use of essential oils 

Mathers' use of the ingredient galangal instead of calamus and/or Crowley's innovative use of essential oils rather than raw ingredients has resulted in some changes from the original recipe:

 Scent: The oils of Mathers and Crowley have a different aroma from the Jewish Abramelin oil. The scent of galangal is gingery and spicy whereas calamus is florally sweet yet a bit yeasty—although the scent of the final oil is strongly cinnamon.
Symbolism: In Jewish, Greek, and European magical botanic symbolism, the ascription given to sweet flag or calamus is generally that of fertility, due to the shape of the plant's fruiting body. Crowley gave the following Qabalistic meaning for galangal: "Galangal represents both Kether and Malkuth, the First and the Last, the One and the Many." Thus Crowley's substitution therefore shifts the symbolism to microcosm/macrocosm unity, which is reflective of Thelema's mystical aim—the union of the adept with the Absolute.
Skin sensation:  The original recipe for Abramelin Oil does not irritate the skin and can be applied according to traditional Jewish and Christian religious and magical practices. Crowley's recipe has a much higher concentration of cinnamon than the original recipe. This results in an oil which can be noticeably hot on the skin and can cause skin rashes if applied too liberally.
Digestive toxicity: Galangal is edible, calamus is not, as it has some toxicity. This is certainly relevant to those who use Crowley's Oil of Abramelin as a core ingredient for the eucharistic Cake of Light, giving it a mild opiated taste (from the myrrh) and a spicy tang (from the cinnamon and the ginger-like galangal). Heavy use of calamus in such a recipe would render the host inedible.

See also
Holy anointing oil
Holy Guardian Angel
Mysticism
List of magical terms and traditions

Notes

References
 Abraham von Worms, edited by Beecken, Johann Richard. (1957).Die heilige Magie des Abramelin von Abraham.  
 Abraham von Worms, edited by Dehn, Georg. Buch Abramelin das ist Die egyptischen großen Offenbarungen. Oder des Abraham von Worms Buch der wahren Praktik in der uralten göttlichen Magie. (Editions Araki, 2001) 
 Abraham of Worms, edited by Dehn, Georg. Book of Abramelin: A New Translation. (Nicholas Hays, September 2006) 
 Abraham of Worms, translated and edited by Mathers, S.L. MacGregor. The Book of the Sacred Magic of Abramelin the Mage.  (1897; reprinted by Dover Publications, 1975) 
 Abraham of Worms, edited by von Inns, Juerg. Das Buch der wahren Praktik in der goettlichen Magie. Diederichs Gelbe Reihe. (1988). 
  
 Koenig, Peter R. (1995). Abramelin & Co. Hiram-Edition.

External links
The Anal-retentive's Guide to Oil of Abramelin by Frater RIKB
Recipe for Mathers-style Macerated Oil of Abramelin by Alchemy Works
Thelemic Consecration of the Oil, by T. Apiryon
Safety Guidelines for Essential Oils

Ceremonial magic
Magic substances